Alpi may refer to:

 ALPI, an enzyme
 Alpi, the Italian word for the Alps
 Alpı (disambiguation), several places in Turkey and Azerbaijan
 Alpi Aviation, an Italian aircraft manufacturer